Bussy-Saint-Georges is a railway station on RER train network in Bussy-Saint-Georges, Seine-et-Marne.

History 
Bussy-Saint-Georges station opened on 21 December 1992 on an already existing portion of the line. In fact, trains on line A of the RER used to run without stopping between Torcy and Marne-la-Vallée - Chessy stations since 1 April 1992, start date of the new terminus of the Marne-la-Vallée branch (A4).

The objective of this commissioning is to support the development of the  new town of Marne-la-Vallée, while serving the agglomeration of Bussy-Saint-Georges which is part of sector 3, known as Val de Bussy, of this new town.

Traffic 
, the estimated annual attendance by the RATP Group was 3,298,143 passengers.

Service

Train
The average waiting time for trains to Paris and to Marne-la-Vallée – Chessy is 15 minutes.

Bus connections
The station is served by several buses:
 Pep's Bus network lines: 22 (to Val d'Europe), 26 (to Lagny-sur-Marne), 27 (to Ferrières-en-Brie), 44 (line serving several districts in Bussy-Saint-Georges and their vicinities) and 46 (to Torcy and to Val d'Europe) ;
  Noctilien network night bus line:  (between Paris (Gare de Lyon) and Marne-la-Vallée–Chessy - Disneyland).

References

Réseau Express Régional stations
Railway stations in France opened in 1992
Railway stations in Seine-et-Marne